Leo Piek (7 September 1927 – 1 June 2013) was a Dutch wrestler. He competed in the men's Greco-Roman lightweight at the 1960 Summer Olympics.

References

External links
 

1927 births
2013 deaths
Dutch male sport wrestlers
Olympic wrestlers of the Netherlands
Wrestlers at the 1960 Summer Olympics
Sportspeople from Utrecht (city)